Dave M. Johnson (born November 16, 1970) is an American former professional basketball player who had a brief career in the National Basketball Association (NBA) in the early 1990s.

Born in Morgan City, Louisiana, Johnson attended Syracuse University, where, as a junior and senior, he developed into a high scoring small forward. Following his senior year, he participated in the now defunct Orlando Classic pre-draft camp/tournament and made the all-tourney team. He had the highest measured vertical leap of all the camp participants (34 inches), was the leading scorer in the tournament (19 points per game) and also won the Slam Dunk Contest. He was selected by the Portland Trail Blazers as the 26th pick in the 1992 NBA draft. He played one season for Portland before moving on to the Chicago Bulls in his second and final NBA season, for whom he played 17 games in 1993-94.

External links
College & NBA stats @ basketballreference.com

1970 births
Living people
African-American basketball players
American expatriate basketball people in France
American expatriate basketball people in Italy
American expatriate basketball people in Spain
American men's basketball players
Basketball players from Louisiana
CB Zaragoza players
Chicago Bulls players
Florida Beachdogs players
JDA Dijon Basket players
Liga ACB players
Maine Central Institute alumni
Partenope Napoli Basket players
People from Morgan City, Louisiana
Portland Trail Blazers draft picks
Portland Trail Blazers players
Rapid City Thrillers players
Small forwards
Syracuse Orange men's basketball players
21st-century African-American sportspeople
20th-century African-American sportspeople